Juan D'Vaughn Pierre (born August 14, 1977) is an American former professional baseball outfielder. He played in Major League Baseball (MLB) from 2000–2013 for the Colorado Rockies, Florida/Miami Marlins, Chicago Cubs, Los Angeles Dodgers, Chicago White Sox, and Philadelphia Phillies. Known for his speed, he stole 614 bases in his career, the 18th-most in MLB history at the time of his retirement. He worked as an MLB Network on-air analyst before joining the Marlins as a Minor League Outfield Coordinator for the 2019 season.

In 1,994 games over 14 seasons, Pierre posted a .295 batting average (2217-for-7525) with 1075 runs, 255 doubles, 94 triples, 18 home runs, 517 RBI, 614 stolen bases, 464 bases on balls, .343 on-base percentage and .361 slugging percentage. He finished his career with a .990 fielding percentage playing at center and left field. In 26 postseason games, he hit .304 (24-for-79) with 16 runs, five doubles, two triples, seven RBI, three stolen bases and eight walks.

Early years
Pierre was born in Mobile, Alabama, to Derry and James. Soon after his birth, his family moved to Alexandria, Louisiana. The Pierres have been deeply rooted in Louisiana since colonial times and are of Creole heritage. Pierre was named after Dominican Hall of Fame pitcher and former Giants player Juan Marichal, his father's favorite player, who also gave him his middle name, D'Vaughn, because he said it had a "good rhyme to it."

Pierre attended Alexandria Senior High School.

College
Prior to his professional career, he played at Galveston College and the University of South Alabama, where he was  Sun Belt Conference Player of the Year.

Minor leagues
Pierre began his professional career with the Portland Rockies of the Northwest League after being selected by Colorado in the 13th round of the 1998 MLB draft. He won the league batting and stolen base titles in his first professional season with 38 and was a fan favorite even at that level. Pierre moved on to the Asheville Tourists the following year, again batting well over .300 and began  with the Carolina Mudcats before finishing the year in Colorado.

Major leagues

Colorado Rockies
Pierre made his major league debut on August 7, 2000, as a pinch runner for the Rockies against the Pittsburgh Pirates. He made his first start in center field the following day and got his first hit in the first inning off José Silva. Pierre received a single vote in 2000 National League Rookie of the Year voting, tying him for sixth place with Lance Berkman and Chuck Smith.

Florida Marlins
On November 16, Pierre was traded along with Mike Hampton and cash to the Florida Marlins for Charles Johnson, Preston Wilson, Vic Darensbourg, and Pablo Ozuna.

In the 2003 regular season, Pierre posted a .305 batting average, led the NL in games played (162), at-bats (668), stolen bases (65), and sacrifice hits (15), and he led the majors with the lowest strikeout percentage (5.2%). During the postseason, he was a major contributor to the Marlins' 2003 World Series championship. He batted .333 in the World Series and .301 overall in his first playoff experience. Pierre received thirty-nine votes in 2003 National League MVP voting, finishing in tenth place.

In 2004, he led the National League in at-bats (for the second year in a row) with 678; hits (221); triples (12); games played (162); bunt hits (24); infield hits (38); and strikeout percentage (5.2%). In addition, he was the only major league player to play every inning of each of his team's games. Pierre received nine votes in 2004 National League MVP voting, tying him for sixteenth place with Todd Helton.

In , Pierre led the National League in games played (162) and had the third-lowest strikeout percentage in baseball (6.9%).

Chicago Cubs

On December 7, 2005, the Marlins traded Pierre to the Chicago Cubs, receiving pitchers Sergio Mitre, Ricky Nolasco, and Renyel Pinto in exchange. The deal was motivated by the Marlins' need to cut payroll after being unable to secure a new stadium deal in South Florida.

In 2006, while batting .292, Pierre led the NL with 204 hits, winning his second hit title, and he led the NL in at-bats (699), games played (162), bunt hits (21), infield hits (30), and lowest strikeout percentage (5.4%). He also tied for the major league lead in times reached base on an error (13), and played perfect defensive baseball, earning a fielding percentage of 1.000. However, he also led the major leagues in outs made (532), the second-highest out total for a player since .

Los Angeles Dodgers
On November 22, 2006, Pierre signed a $44 million contract with the Los Angeles Dodgers.

In , Pierre led the majors in bunt hits (19). He also led the NL in games played (162) for the fifth straight year, led the NL in singles (164) for the second straight year, led the league in sacrifice hits (20), and had the lowest strikeout percentage in the NL (5.5%). He was second in the NL in stolen bases (64), third in at bats (668) and plate appearances (729), fourth in hits (196), and ninth in triples (8).

Going into , the Dodgers signed Andruw Jones to a two-year contract to play center field. Because of this, Pierre shifted to left field. After a trip to the DL in July, Pierre was moved into a platoon in center field with the struggling Jones. When the Dodgers traded for Manny Ramirez, Pierre moved to the bench and saw limited action, primarily as a pinch runner the rest of the season.

After nearly two years without hitting a home run, Pierre hit a ball into the right field seats at PNC Park in Pittsburgh on September 15, 2008. It was Pierre's first traditional fly-ball home run since August 28, 2006, also in Pittsburgh. On July 29, 2008, Pierre stole his 100th base with the Dodgers, becoming only one of four players in MLB history to steal at least 100 bases with three different teams. He previously stole 100 with the Colorado Rockies and 167 with the Florida Marlins. Tommy Harper, Brett Butler, and Otis Nixon are the only others to have accomplished this feat.

Prior to the start of the 2009 season, the Dodgers gave Pierre and his agent permission to talk to other teams in hopes of working out a trade because Ramirez's re-signing with the Dodgers pushed Pierre to the backup role in left field. Pierre tied former Dodgers player Steve Sax on the top 50 career MLB stolen base leaders list with 444 on June 12, 2009, against the Texas Rangers in Arlington. The next day, June 13, he pushed Sax out of the top 50 with his 445th steal, again versus the Rangers in Arlington.

When Manny Ramirez received a 50-game suspension, Pierre once more became the Dodgers' regular left fielder. During Ramirez's suspension, Pierre delivered a stellar performance that drew praise from fans and critics alike. However, once Ramirez returned, he resumed his previous role of a backup player. In recognition of his hard work, Dodgers fans gave him a standing ovation on July 16− the same game where Ramirez had his first home game since returning from suspension.

Chicago White Sox

On December 15, 2009, Pierre was traded to the Chicago White Sox for two minor league pitching prospects to be named later (Jon Link and John Ely). Pierre led Major League Baseball with a career-high 68 stolen bases, the second-most in a single season in franchise history after only Rudy Law's 77 in 1983. On August 3, 2010, he hit his first and only home run of 2010 off Rick Porcello. On August 5, 2010, he stole his 500th career base against the Detroit Tigers.

In 2011, Pierre led the major leagues in sacrifice hits (19) and at bats per strikeout (15.6), and he was caught stealing a major-league-leading 17 times (while stealing 27 bases). On defense, he tied for the major league lead in errors by a left fielder, with seven.

Philadelphia Phillies
On January 27, 2012 Pierre signed a minor league contract with the Philadelphia Phillies. The Phillies purchased his contract on March 29, and he was subsequently added to their opening day roster. He hit a three-run home run on June 23. On June 28, he got his 500th career RBI. In 130 games — 98 starting in left field — Pierre hit .307/.351/.371 with six triples and 37 stolen bases.

Miami Marlins

On November 17, 2012, Pierre signed a one-year, $1.6 million deal with the Miami Marlins. He played the 2013 season with Miami and became a free agent at the end of the season.

He had hoped to sign with another team and was often mentioned in press reports about teams requiring depth in the outfield to cover for injured or under-performing players. However, he went unsigned for the entire season and announced his retirement from professional baseball on February 27, 2015.

Pierre was eligible to be elected into the Hall of Fame in 2019 but received less than 5% of the vote and became ineligible for the 2020 ballot.

See also

 List of Colorado Rockies team records
 List of Major League Baseball annual stolen base leaders
 List of Major League Baseball annual triples leaders
 List of Major League Baseball career hits leaders
 List of Major League Baseball career putouts as a center fielder leaders
 List of Major League Baseball career putouts as an outfielder leaders
 List of Major League Baseball career singles leaders
 List of Major League Baseball career stolen bases leaders
 List of Major League Baseball stolen base records
 List of Miami Marlins team records

References

External links

1977 births
Living people
Major League Baseball center fielders
Colorado Rockies players
Florida Marlins players
Chicago Cubs players
Los Angeles Dodgers players
Chicago White Sox players
Philadelphia Phillies players
Miami Marlins players
Baseball players from Alabama
African-American baseball players
American League stolen base champions
National League stolen base champions
Asheville Tourists players
Portland Rockies players
Carolina Mudcats players
Colorado Springs Sky Sox players
Las Vegas 51s players
Sportspeople from Mobile, Alabama
Galveston Whitecaps baseball players
South Alabama Jaguars baseball players
21st-century African-American sportspeople
20th-century African-American sportspeople